in•ter a•li•a is the fourth studio album by At the Drive-In, released on May 5, 2017. It is their first studio album in 17 years since Relationship of Command, and their first release since the 2005 compilation album This Station Is Non-Operational. It is also the first studio release by the band since El Gran Orgo to not feature founding member Jim Ward, who chose not to participate in the band's second reunion; as well as the first studio album by the band to feature former Sparta guitarist Keeley Davis.

Background
in•ter a•li•a was recorded during the second half of 2016 following a proper reunion tour beginning in March of that year. Drummer Tony Hajjar said of recording the album: "It was the most fun I’ve had in years. It was so great to be around people I care for and care for me. We had some awesome, tough moments. But at the end, they were still great. When it was done we went into the studio control room, the last day of recording, we all just hugged each other. I’m so proud of my brothers, proud that we’ve done this, proud that we still get to do this at any level."

Describing the record's second single, "Incurably Innocent", singer Cedric Bixler-Zavala stated that it is "a song about sexual abuse and being able to finally speak out." In 2017, he alleged that the song covered Danny Masterson's rape of Bixler-Zavala's wife.

The album's title is a variation on the Latin phrase "inter alia" which means "among other things".
The cover artwork (including the lyric music videos for the singles "Governed by Contagions" and "Incurably Innocent"), were illustrated by Damon Locks.

On August 14, the band released a music video for "Call Broken Arrow"

Release 
The record was unveiled on Wednesday, February 22 following a few short clips being shared by the band's various social media pages the previous week leading up to the announcement. Pre-orders were immediately available for the digital album, CD, cassette, and three different vinyl editions of the record, two of which are exclusive to various bundles offered through the webstore. The digital downloads for the album's singles were offered in wave format upon pre-ordering.

12 bundles were available offering slightly different configurations of items. The "MEGA" bundle was priced at $290 and included a 30.75" skateboard deck limited to 300 copies, as well as an exclusive Mantic Axiom Reverb guitar/bass effects pedal limited to only 150 copies. This particular bundle also included its own special "half cyan/half blue" splatter vinyl LP limited to 150 copies as well. The other versions are a picture disc vinyl limited to 537 copies among a variety of bundle selections, and the standard "half bone/half black" splatter vinyl, the latter of which is available outside of any of the bundle options as a standalone purchase.

Track listing

Personnel
At the Drive-In
Cedric Bixler-Zavala – lead vocals
Omar Rodríguez-López – guitar, production
Keeley Davis – guitar
Paul Hinojos – bass
Tony Hajjar – drums, percussion

Technical
Rich Costey – production, mixing
Martin Cooke – engineering
Nicolas Fournier – engineering
Gentry Studer – mastering
Damon Locks – cover art, illustrations, art direction
Christopher Friedman – layout

Charts

References

At the Drive-In albums
2017 albums
Rise Records albums